Tamran Rural District is a rural district (dehestan) in the Central District of Kalaleh County, Golestan Province, Iran. At the 2006 census, its population was 16,625, in 3,183 families.  The rural district has 20 villages.

References 

Rural Districts of Golestan Province
Kalaleh County